, the "Master of Breasts", is a Japanese manga artist and illustrator known for his distinctive style of beautiful characters. His work is the basis for anime such as Plastic Little and Legend of Lemnear, and appears in the Langrisser and Growlanser series of tactical role-playing video games.

Early life
Satoshi Urushihara was born on February 9, 1966, in Hiroshima Prefecture, Japan. He met fellow illustrator Kinji Yoshimoto in 1983 while attending a technical high school in Miyajima. He effectively started his career in manga and anime when he was selected as animator for the animated movie , produced by Kadokawa Haruki Jimusho and Toei Animation, a position he was actively looking for.

Anime and manga career

After graduating from high school in 1984, he was employed by Toei Animation and after gaining some experience he was promoted to key animator with the animated TV series The Transformers and provided mechanical designs for The Transformers: The Movie.

The next year, Urushihara became a freelancer, working mainly in original video animations. It was his work with the OVA Megazone 23 Part II (1986) that made him recognized by producers of AIC. This lead him to be the character designer and animation supervisor of the adult-restricted OVA  (New Cream Lemon series, episode 2) released in 1987. This work was his debut as character designer, although at the time of the original OVA release, his name was kept secret and afterwards announced on the official website of Earthwork. In 1990, he was the character designer and chief production supervisor for the seventh episode of Bubblegum Crisis called "Double Vision".

In 1990, along with illustrators Kinji Yoshimoto and Yoshihiro Kimura, he created the production company Earthwork.

Works

Manga
 Legend of Lemnear (1991–1993)
 Plastic Little: Captain's Log (1994)
 Chirality (1995–1997)
 Eidron Shadow (1999–2002)
 Mirowoire: The Mirror Within a Mirror
 Ragnarock City (2000–2001)
 Ryoujoku (also known as Love Intermission)
 Vampire Master Dark Crimson (2000)
 RC Twins (enclosed within the "Sigma" artbook) (2006)

Artbooks

 Satoshi Urushihara Cell Works. . (1994/05/01) (Note: title is in English.)
 . . (1996/10)
 . . (1997/11/06)
 . . (1998/08/14)
 . . (2002/08)
 . . (2003/04)
 . . (2003/12) (Note: title is in English, with katakana transliteration.)
 . . (2003/12/17)
 . . (2004/06) (Note: title is in English, with katakana transliteration.)
 . . (2005/03)
 . . (2005/04/02)
 . . (2005/10/03)
 . . (2006/06/30)
 . . (2009/11/30)

Anime
Another Lady Innocent (2004) (Japanese title Front Innocent)
Riding Bean (1989) (vehicle animation designer)
Crying Freeman (Production Supervision (vol 3 & 4))
Growlanser IV (Character Design) (2003)
Legend of Lemnear (1989)
Plastic Little (1994)
Bubblegum Crisis (Chief Production Supervisor and Guest Character Designer (Episode 7: Double Vision (1990)))
Record of Lodoss War (OVA) (Assistant Animator, Production Supervision (Ep 5))
Ikki Tousen: Dragon Destiny (Ending Animation Character Design)

Video games
 Langrisser series
 Growlanser series
 Cybernator (Assault Suits Valken in Japan)
 Next King: Millennial Kingdom of LoveOther works
 Provided artwork for the Street Fighter II drama CDs, Mad Revenger, and Portrait of the Magician Satoshi Urushihara Posterbox Transformers series
 Tenma Magazine covers
 In his artbook Nostalgic Heroines, Urushihara creates a series of images that involves characters, mainly female, from well-known popular anime series including Neon Genesis Evangelion, Martian Successor Nadesico, and Dirty Pair''.

References

External links
 Satoshi Urushihara's blog 
 Earthwork official webpage (adults only) 
 
 Urushihara Satoshi at the Ultimate Manga Guide
 うるし原智志 at pixiv.net

1966 births
Anime character designers
Hentai creators
Japanese animators
Living people
Manga artists
People from Hiroshima Prefecture